}}

Luciano Vassallo (15 August 1935 – 16 September 2022) was a footballer of Eritrean and Italian origin who played for the Ethiopia national team in the 1960s. He captained the winning team at the 1962 African Cup of Nations, Ethiopia's only trophy to date. He was known for his skill, and mostly for his volleys, free kicks and penalties. He played professionally with Cotton Factory Club along with his half-brother Italo.

Early life
Luciano was born in Asmara to Vittorio Vassallo, an officer in the Italian rifle regiment and an Eritrean woman called Mebrak Abraham. Vittorio was transferred to Addis Ababa in 1937 and they never heard from him again. As mixed-race children they were marginalised at school and treated with contempt due to the Italian racial laws. This led Luciano to drop out of school during the third grade and study as a mechanic at a railway workshop.

Luciano initially began playing football for Stella Asmarina, a team set up by the Vicarage Apostolic exclusively for Italo-Eritrean children. He started his footballing career as a left-back, before being moved to centre back then eventually into midfield where he became known as an advanced playmaker with a powerful shot.

Club career
Luciano played for GS Gejeret and GS Asmara, an Ethiopian team as Eritrea had been annexed in 1950. During his time at GS Asmara the federation deliberately prevented the team from winning the Ethiopian First Division. However during the run-up to the 1959 Africa Cup of Nations, GS Asmara managed to humiliate the Ethiopian national team in a friendly match.

He signed to play for Cotton Factory Club of Dire Dawa in 1960, where, along with his half-brother, he won the Ethiopian First Division in 1960, 1962, 1963 and 1965. Luciano credited his experience as a mechanic for getting a job at the associated cotton plantation, which allowed him to receive a salary ten times that of a normal worker.

International career
Luciano played for the Ethiopia national team in the qualifying rounds for the 1962 FIFA World Cup. With his half-brother Italo, Luciano was part of the 1962 African Cup of Nations campaign when Ethiopia won their only trophy to date. Prior to the campaign he was told to change his first and last name in order to sound like a real Ethiopian, which he refused. Luciano, captain of the team, scored two goals in the semifinal against Tunisia and was tied for third highest scorer in the tournament, and was named player of the tournament, the only Ethiopian to claim that award. He was handed the trophy by His Highness Haile Selassie, despite an attempt to remove him from the captaincy in order to allow for an Ethiopian player to lift the trophy.

In 2006, CAF began the selection for the best African footballer in the last fifty years. Luciano, along with legendary teammate and friend Mengistu Worku were selected in the group of the top 50 players, as the only Ethiopians, but were not selected in the final 30, where Roger Milla was named number one. Many consider Vassallo to be the best Ethiopian footballer in history, after Worku and Ydnekatchew Tessema.

Managerial career
Vassallo then went to study as a coach at Coverciano in Florence, Italy. He went on to coach Ethiopia national team on several occasions.
 
During the Red Terror, Luciano Vassallo was arrested after he denounced the use of the amphetamine Captagon that was being used by the Ethiopian national team. He was stripped of his duties as coach and was set to be taken away by Mengistu Haile Mariam's soldiers however one of the colonels recognised his footballing hero and let him go.

He was reinstated as national team manager in 1978 but, two weeks after a historic win over East Germany, he fled to Djibouti then to Rome, where he had sent his family to safety some months earlier.

After football

In exile in Italy, Luciano began repairing cars in Ostia before opening his own garage and finally obtaining citizenship. Later he founded a school for young footballers called Olimpia Ostia.

In 2000 he published a biography titled Mamma ecco I soldi or Mom here's the money. After retiring, he lived in Rome.

Career statistics

International goals

Scores and results list Ethiopia's goal tally first, score column indicates score after each Vassallo goal.

See also
 Italian Eritreans
 Italians of Ethiopia
 Italo Vassallo

References

Bibliography
 Felici, Antonio. Stella d'Africa – La vita straordinaria di Luciano Vassallo, mito del calcio africano anni '60, esule in Italia Edizioni Coralli, Roma, 2014 (Excerpts) 
 Vassallo, Luciano. Mamma ecco i soldi. Editore: Coralli. Roma, 2000

External links
Luciano Vassallo's official website
FIFA statistics

1935 births
2022 deaths
Sportspeople from Asmara
Eritrean footballers
Ethiopian footballers
Saint George S.C. players
Ethiopia international footballers
Eritrean football managers
Ethiopian football managers
Ethiopia national football team managers
Saint George S.C. managers
Ethiopian people of Eritrean descent
Ethiopian people of Italian descent
Eritrean people of Italian descent
1962 African Cup of Nations players
1968 African Cup of Nations players
Africa Cup of Nations-winning players
Association football midfielders